Theatres Act may refer to:

 Theatres Act 1843, a law in the United Kingdom governing the theatre industry
 Theatres Act, 1953, a law in Ontario, Canada now succeeded by the Film Classification Act, 2005
 Theatres Act 1968, a law in the United Kingdom governing stage performances